Banigbé may refer to several places in Benin:

Banigbé, Donga
Banigbé, Plateau